Henri Georges de France (7 September 1911 Paris – 29 April 1986 Paris) was a pioneering French television inventor. His inventions include the 819 line French standard and the SECAM color system. He was also apparently behind the HD-MAC high-definition standard.

On December 6, 1931, De France founded the Compagnie Générale de Télévision in Le Havre, making television sets with a vertical definition of 60 lines. In February 1932, De France made several transmissions over a distance of 7 km from the "Radio-Normandie" station in Fécamp. These signals were received by a few people located over 100 km away. In October 1932, he achieved a definition of 120 lines. In 1956, he patented the SECAM color television system. On October 1, 1967 at 2:15pm CET, la deuxième chaîne switched from black and white to color using SECAM.

De France is interred in Paris (cimetière du Montparnasse).

The public passage near France Télévisions buildings in Paris is named Esplanade Henri de France.

Patents 
 Apparatus for determining a direction, US 2513849, issued 4 July 1950 
 Television device for recording motion pictures thereof, US 2531031, issued 21 November 1950
 Amplifier system, US 2589542, issued 18 March 1952
 Communication system between two stations linked by television, US 2637022, issued 28 April 1953
 Television system, US 2700700, issued 25 January 1955 
 Color television, US 2876278, issued 3 March 1959

French electrical engineers
20th-century French inventors
1911 births
1986 deaths
Scientists from Paris
Recipients of the Resistance Medal
Burials at Montparnasse Cemetery